Louis Welden Hawkins (1849–1910) was a Symbolist painter. He was born of English parents, later taking French nationality.

Life
He was born in Stuttgart, Germany on 1 July 1849. His mother was an Austrian Baroness, his father an Englishman.
 
He soon moved to France and later took French nationality. He attended the Académie Julian in Paris. Hawkins rose to fame after his expositions in the Salon de la Société des Artistes Francais. His first works were shown in the Salon in 1881. After that, expositions followed at the Salon de la Société des Beaux-Arts (1894–1911), the Salon de la Rose + Croix (1894–95)  and La Libre Esthétique in Brussels.

He lived for a period with Camille Pelletan, a radical socialist politician, and he continued to move in radical circles. In his Portrait of Séverine (1895), he shows a popular journalist, Séverine, who was a famous defender of humanitarian causes. He was also friendly with artists such as James Abbott McNeill Whistler and Auguste Rodin, whose portrait he painted.

He spent his last years in Brittany, where he painted mostly landscapes.

He died on 1 May 1910 and was honoured a year later at the Salon Nationale.

Style
After his education at the Académie Julian, Hawkins chose the path of Symbolism. Symbolism began as an artistic movement that developed from Romanticism in France in the second half of the 19th century, taking its themes of decadence, dandyism and mysticism.
Symbolism was a reaction to Impressionism. Symbolist painting emphasized fantasy and imagination in their depiction of objects. Symbolist artists often used metaphors and symbols to suggest a subject and favored mystical themes. Hawkins became famous because of his fine and dreamy female portraits.

Selected paintings

Other selected works 
 Le Foyer, musée des Beaux-Arts in Nantes.
 Musée d'Orsay in Paris
 Le Sphinx et la Chimère, 1906, oil, 80x73 cm
 Portrait de Jeune Homme, 1881, huile sur toile, 57x44,5 cm
 Une prière à Dieu, 1900, watercolor
 Procession des Âmes, 1893, oil, 67.4 x 44 cm
 L'Innocence, about 1895, oil, 73 x 50.4 cm, Amsterdam, Van Gogh museum.

See also 
Symbolism

References

External links

An example of his work: The Haloes  

1849 births
1910 deaths
Symbolist painters
19th-century English painters
English male painters
20th-century English painters
19th-century French painters
French male painters
20th-century French painters
20th-century French male artists
Académie Julian alumni
19th-century French male artists
20th-century English male artists
19th-century English male artists